Hördler is a German surname. Notable people with the surname include:

 Frank Hördler (born 1985), German ice hockey player
 Stefan Hördler, German historian who specializes in the Holocaust

German-language surnames